"Know Me" is a song by Canadian rapper Nav, released on November 2, 2018, as the lead single from his second studio album Bad Habits (2019). It was produced by Pro Logic and Austin Powerz.

Background and composition
Over email, Nav told The Fader about a studio session that led to the making of the song: "I was recording on of a lot of my own beats & of other producers. When I ran out I asked my engineer Pro Logic to play me some of his own beats -one of the first ones he played me became 'Know Me'."

The song, beginning with a name-drop to Balenciaga, finds Nav melodically rapping about his sexual conquests with women, collection of VVS diamonds and fame, calling himself the "hottest brown boy in the game".

Music video
The music video was released on November 2, 2018 and directed by David Camarena. In it, Nav parks his bright red Ferrari in the driveway of a mansion. He struts through the insides of it, which is splattered in glow in the dark paint, in the company of "scantily clad" women and a python.

Charts

References

2018 singles
2018 songs
Nav (rapper) songs
Songs written by Nav (rapper)
Songs written by Amir Esmailian
XO (record label) singles
Republic Records singles